Hans Ravenborg (5 April 1921 – 30 July 2008) was a German sailor who competed in the 1960 Summer Olympics.

References

1921 births
2008 deaths
German male sailors (sport)
Olympic sailors of the United Team of Germany
Sailors at the 1960 Summer Olympics – Dragon